Jana Šimánková (born ) is a retired Czech female volleyball player, who played as a setter. She was part of the Czech Republic women's national volleyball team at the 2002 FIVB Volleyball Women's World Championship in Germany.

Clubs
 Panathinaikos women's volleyball
 Olympiacos women's volleyball
 Královo Pole Brno

References

1980 births
Living people
Czech women's volleyball players
Panathinaikos Women's Volleyball players
Olympiacos Women's Volleyball players
Sportspeople from Brno
Setters (volleyball)
Expatriate volleyball players in Greece
Czech expatriate sportspeople in Greece